John Fox (10 March 1851 – 10 August 1929) was an English cricketer who played two matches for Gloucestershire in 1872.

References

1851 births
1929 deaths
English cricketers
Gloucestershire cricketers